Bastien Bouillon is a French actor. He has appeared in more than 30 film and television productions since 2009. He is the son of the stage director Gilles Bouillon.

Filmography

Theatre

References

External links
 

Living people
French male film actors
French male television actors
French male stage actors
21st-century French male actors
Place of birth missing (living people)
Year of birth missing (living people)
Most Promising Actor César Award winners